Ali Gaye is an American football defensive end who currently plays for the LSU Tigers.

Early life and high school
Gaye was born in The Gambia and immigrated to the United States with his family when he was 12, settling in Everett, Washington. He began playing American football in eighth grade at the age of 14. He attended Edmonds Woodway High School and was named All-Wesco 3A/2A in each of his final three seasons. Gaye was rated a three-star recruit and initially signed a letter of intent to play college football at the University of Washington and grayshirt his freshman season over offers from USC, Arizona, California and Mississippi. He ultimately was not accepted by the university due to failing to meet the school's SAT requirement.

College career
Gaye began his collegiate career at Arizona Western College. He transferred to Garden City Community College in Garden City, Kansas before his sophomore year after Arizona Western disbanded their football team. Gaye was named to the first team All-Jayhawk League after finishing the season with 44 tackles, 7.5 tackles for a loss, one sack, one forced fumble and two blocked kicks. Gaye committed to transfer to LSU for his final two seasons of eligibility over offers from Oklahoma and Nebraska.

Gaye was named a starter at defensive end for the Tigers. In his first game with the team, he recorded three tackles with two tackles for loss and a sack while also having a team-high three passes defended. Gaye finished the season with 32 tackles, 9.5 tackles for a loss, two sacks and six passes defended and was named second team All-Southeastern Conference.

References

External links 
 Arizona Western Matadors bio
 Garden City Bronco Busters bio
 LSU Tigers bio

1998 births
Living people
American football defensive ends
Players of American football from Washington (state)
LSU Tigers football players
Gambian players of American football
Arizona Western Matadors football players
Garden City Broncbusters football players